The 2017–18 Oklahoma State Cowboys basketball team represented Oklahoma State University in the 2017–18 NCAA Division I men's basketball season. They were led by first-head coach Mike Boynton Jr. The Cowboys were members of the Big 12 Conference and played their home games at Gallagher-Iba Arena in Stillwater, Oklahoma. They finished the season 21–15, 8–10 in Big 12 play to finish in a four-way tie for sixth place. They defeated Oklahoma in the first round of the Big 12 tournament before losing in the quarterfinals to Kansas. They were invited to the National Invitation Tournament where they defeated Florida Gulf Coast and Stanford before losing in the quarterfinals to Western Kentucky.

Previous season 
The Cowboys finished the 2016–17 season with 20–13, 9–9 in Big 12 play to finish in fifth place. They lost to Iowa State in the quarterfinals of the Big 12 tournament. They received an at-large bid to the NCAA tournament as the No. 10 seed in the Midwest region where they lost to Michigan in the first round.

On March 18, 2017, head coach Brad Underwood left the school to accept the head coaching position at Illinois after one year at OSU. The school promoted assistant coach Mike Boynton Jr. to head coach on March 24.

FBI investigation

On September 26, federal prosecutors in New York announced charges of fraud and corruption against 10 people involved in college basketball, including Oklahoma State assistant coach Lamont Evans. The charges allege that Evans and others allegedly received benefits from financial advisers and others to influence student-athletes to retain their services. Following the news, Evans was suspended and relieved of all duties. Evans was sentenced to three months in prison in June 2019 for his participation in the scheme, which he also conducted at the University of South Carolina.

In June 2020, a press release by the NCAA announced that the men’s basketball team will be prohibited from participating in 2020-21 postseason competition and the university will self-impose a fine of $10,000 plus 1 percent of the men’s basketball program’s budget.

Departures

Incoming Transfers

Recruits

Future recruits

2018-19 team recruits

Roster

Schedule and results

|-
! colspan=9 style="background:#000000; color:#FF6600;"|Exhibition

|-
!colspan=9 style="background:#000000; color:#FF6600;"| Regular season

|-
!colspan=12 style="background:#000000; color:#FF6600;"| Big 12 tournament

|-
!colspan=12 style="background:#000000; color:#FF6600;"| NIT

References

Oklahoma State Cowboys basketball seasons
Oklahoma State
Oklahoma State Cowboys bask
Oklahoma State Cowboys bask
Oklahoma State